Detective is an Indian Bengali thriller-drama film directed by Joydip Mukherjee and produced by Shree Venkatesh Films. The film features Anirban Bhattacharya, Ishaa Saha in lead roles with Saheb Bhattacharya, Trina Saha, and Ambarish Bhattacharya in the supporting roles. The film is based on eponymous short story of Rabindranath Tagore. The film was released on 14 August 2020 on Bengali OTT platform Hoichoi. It is the first Bengali film released on OTT platform directly.

Plot 
A Bengali thriller comedy based on Tagore's story of the same name. Set during the time of the British Raj, the backdrop for the story is the partition of Bengal in 1905. The film revolves around Mahimchandra, a detective with the Bengal police. His obsession with western detective novels and crimes makes him think that his job is too boring. Mahimchandra searches for the perfect crime with a complex motive that will make his profession somewhat exciting. Filled with hilarious dialogues and comic deductions of Mahimchandra, the film progresses with the growing political turmoil of the Swadeshi movement. As Mahimchandra continues his search for the perfect criminal, his obsession starts to affect his career and personal life.

Cast 
Anirban Bhattacharya as Mahimchandra
Ishaa Saha as Shudhamukhi
Saheb Bhattacharya as Manmothanath
Trina Saha as Snehalata
Ambarish Bhattacharya as Hutashon/Watson
Shreetoma Bhattacharya as Harimati

Soundtrack

References

External links
 

2020 films
Bengali-language Indian films
2020 thriller drama films
2020s Bengali-language films
Films directed by Joydip Mukherjee
Indian drama films
Films based on works by Rabindranath Tagore